Anwarul Iqbal (1 October 1950 – 15 January 2015) was an adviser of 2007–2009 interim caretaker government of Bangladesh. He was appointed as Local Government and Rural Development Minister & Labour Minister of the non-party interim caretaker government of Bangladesh on 17 January 2007 and remained in that post until elections were held two years later. Later he was given the charge of the Jute & Textile Ministry. He had the responsibility to head three ministries of the government of Bangladesh. He served as the 25th Inspector General of Bangladesh police. He went into voluntary retirement from the IGP post after he had been made officer on special duty and within few days he took charge as the adviser of the caretaker government headed by Fakhruddin Ahmed during the state of emergency in Bangladesh which was declared on 11 January 2007.

Early life 
Iqbal was born in Feni in the then East Bengal. He was the son of Mohammed Islam, a government officer. He passed his Secondary School Certificate (SSC) in 1965 from Memnagar BD High School in Chuadanga, Higher Secondary School Certificate (HSC) from Dhaka College in 1967 and Masters of Arts in Bengali literature from University of Chittagong in 1969–1971. He took part in the Liberation War of 1971. Later he was trained at the Bramshill Police Staff College, United Kingdom and the Human Rights Centre at Geneva, Switzerland.

Career

Bangladesh Police 

Iqbal joined Bangladesh Police on 22 August 1973 as assistant superintendent of police. He was one of the earliest officers recruited to the Bangladesh police after independence. He served as the chief of most of the units in Bangladesh Police Force which includes police headquarters, the Criminal Investigation Department, the Special Branch, Dhaka Metropolitan Police, Rapid Action Battalion, Chittagong Metropolitan Police, Khulna Metropolitan Police, Detective Training School, Armed Police Battalion and Sylhet, Kushtia, Khulna and Chittagong districts and Magura, Kishorganj and Bagerhat sub-divisions. For his contribution to the service and the nation he was given a gallantry award, the President Police Medal, in 1980, and Bangladesh Police Medal in 2000 and 2002.

On 6 July 2006, Iqbal became the 25th Inspector General of Police (IGP). On 15 January 2007 he took voluntary retirement from service just a day before his sworn-in as an Advisor.

United nations 
Iqbal played a significant role in the UN mission at Mozambique (ONUMOZ) and Angola (UNAVEM III). In 1993–1994, he was civilian police chief and acting commissioner in the Mozambique mission ONUMOZ. He won repute as police commissioner at the UN peacekeeping mission at Angola. He remained in that post during the whole period of UNAVEM III. He was the first Asian to serve as civilian police chief in any United Nations peacekeeping mission.

Director General of Rapid Action Battalion

Being the founding director general of the force Rapid Action Battalion,

Interim Government 2007–2009 

Iqbal sworn-in as adviser which is equivalent to a cabinet minister of the non-party care-taker government on 17 January 2007 by the President of Bangladesh Dr. Iajuddin Ahmed. He was given the charge of two ministries, one being the Local Government and Rural Development and Co-operative and the other Labour and Employment Ministry.

In the short span of time Iqbal established the Local Government Commission to ensure accountability and transparency, amended the acts of Upazila Parishad, Union Council, Municipal Council and City Corporations for women empowerment and ensuring Governance friendly persons' participation in Local Level election.

During his tenure, government successfully held the Elections to the local government bodies including city corporations, municipalities, union council and specially long due elections to upazila parishads which had not been held for the last 17 years during the tenure of previous political governments. With the intention of decentralizing, and devolving the authority to local governments, he emphasised the election of honest, dedicated and capable representatives to ensure good governance, and build up a just, equitable and enlightened society.

As the adviser of Labour and Employment ministry, he managed to set a standard of labour wages, benefits like service book, holidays, ID cards etc. and constant effort on implementation of minimum wages in all the factories throughout the country improved the Compliance situation up to mention able level in the garment sector of Bangladesh. This ultimately improved the labour rights situation in the country and concludes an era of labour violence in the sector. Ready Made Garments (RMG) sector is the highest foreign currency earner for Bangladesh. He also led the way to finalise the new Labour Law in Bangladesh and successfully eradicated Child Labour from hazardous work

The other ministry he headed was Ministry of Jute and Textiles. One of the major achievements of Iqbal's time is reopening a number of major jute mills of Bangladesh which were closed down to lessen losses of government.

Death
Iqbal died from a cardiac arrest, suffered while working out at his daughter's home in Dubai, United Arab Emirates on 15 January 2015. He was married to Dora Anwar. Together they had two daughters, Fahbin Anwar and Tasnim Anwar.

References

1950 births
2015 deaths
People from Feni District
Dhaka College alumni
Inspectors General of Police (Bangladesh)
Advisors of Caretaker Government of Bangladesh